This is a list of diplomatic missions in Seychelles.  At present, the capital city of Victoria hosts 10 embassies. Several other countries have ambassadors accredited to Seychelles, with a plurality being resident in Nairobi.

Embassies/high commissions in Victoria

Other missions
 Consular agency

Non-resident embassies/high commissions accredited to Seychelles

Resident in Addis Ababa, Ethiopia

 
 
 
 
 
 
 

Resident in Antananarivo, Madagascar

 

 

Resident in Dar es Salaam, Tanzania

 
 

 
 
 

 

Resident in Nairobi, Kenya

 
 
 
  
 
 
 
 
 
 
 
 
  
 
 
 

 
 
 

 
 
 

 
 

 

Resident in New Delhi, India

 
 
 

 

Resident in Port Louis, Mauritius

 

 

 

Resident in Pretoria, South Africa

 
 
 
 
 
 
 

Resident elsewhere

 (Abu Dhabi)
 (Libreville)
 (Libreville)
 (Colombo)
 (Harare)
 (Valletta)
 (Algiers)
 (Dakar)
 (Singapore)
 (Maputo)
 (Canberra)
 (Maputo)

References

External links
Ministry of Foreign Affairs of Seychelles
Diplomatic List

Foreign relations of Seychelles
Seychelles
Diplomatic missions